Cozi is a feminine given name. Notable people with the name include:

 Cozi Zuehlsdorff (born 1998), American actress
 Cozi Costi, British singer

Feminine given names